In numerical linear algebra, the Chebyshev iteration is an
iterative method for determining the solutions of a system of linear equations. The method is named after Russian mathematician Pafnuty Chebyshev.

Chebyshev iteration avoids the computation of inner products as is necessary for the other nonstationary methods. For some distributed-memory architectures these inner products are a bottleneck with respect to efficiency. The price one pays for avoiding inner products is that the method requires enough knowledge about spectrum of the coefficient matrix A, that is an upper estimate for the upper eigenvalue and lower estimate for the lower eigenvalue.  There are modifications of the method for nonsymmetric matrices A.

Example code in MATLAB

function [x] = SolChebyshev002(A, b, x0, iterNum, lMax, lMin)

  d = (lMax + lMin) / 2;
  c = (lMax - lMin) / 2;
  preCond = eye(size(A)); % Preconditioner
  x = x0;
  r = b - A * x;

  for i = 1:iterNum % size(A, 1)
      z = linsolve(preCond, r);
      if (i == 1)
          p = z;
          alpha = 1/d;
      else if (i == 2)
          beta = (1/2) * (c * alpha)^2
          alpha = 1/(d - beta / alpha);
          p = z + beta * p;
      else
          beta = (c * alpha / 2)^2;
          alpha = 1/(d - beta / alpha);
          p = z + beta * p;
      end;

      x = x + alpha * p;
      r = b - A * x; %(= r - alpha * A * p)
      if (norm(r) < 1e-15), break; end; % stop if necessary
  end;
end
Code translated from 
 
and.

See also
 Iterative method. Linear systems
 List of numerical analysis topics. Solving systems of linear equations
 Jacobi iteration
 Gauss–Seidel method
 Modified Richardson iteration
 Successive over-relaxation
 Conjugate gradient method
 Generalized minimal residual method
 Biconjugate gradient method
 Iterative Template Library
 IML++

References

External links 
 Templates for the Solution of Linear Systems
 Chebyshev Iteration. From MathWorld
 Chebyshev Iteration. Implementation on Go language

Numerical linear algebra
Iterative methods